Kossów  is a village in the administrative district of Gmina Radków, within Włoszczowa County, Świętokrzyskie Voivodeship, in south-central Poland.

The village has a population of 360.

For centuries Kossow belonged to Lelów County, Kraków Voivodeship, historic province of Lesser Poland. It is not known when it received Magdeburg rights: probably this happened some time in the 14th century. Jan Długosz wrote that in the 15th century it already was a private town. Kossow remained a small town, losing its charter in 1869, as a punishment for January Uprising. 
    
The village has wooden church of Our Lady of Częstochowa (17th century, rebuilt in 1937 and 1958), wooden bell tower (17th century), and a 19th-century water mill.

References

Villages in Włoszczowa County
Kraków Voivodeship (14th century – 1795)
Kielce Governorate
Kielce Voivodeship (1919–1939)